An index fund (also index tracker) is a mutual fund or exchange-traded fund (ETF) designed to follow certain preset rules so that the fund can  a specified basket of underlying investments. While index providers often emphasize that they are for-profit organizations, index providers have the ability to act as "reluctant regulators" when determining which companies are suitable for an index. Those rules may include tracking prominent indexes like the S&P 500 or the Dow Jones Industrial Average or implementation rules, such as tax-management, tracking error minimization, large block trading or patient/flexible trading strategies that allow for greater tracking error but lower market impact costs. Index funds may also have rules that screen for social and sustainable criteria. 

An index fund's rules of construction clearly identify the type of companies suitable for the fund. The most commonly known index fund in the United States, the S&P 500 Index Fund, is based on the rules established by S&P Dow Jones Indices for their S&P 500 Index. Equity index funds would include groups of stocks with similar characteristics such as the size, value, profitability and/or geographic location of the companies. A group of stocks may include companies from the United States, Non-US Developed, emerging markets or frontier market countries. Additional index funds within these geographic markets may include indexes of companies that include rules based on company characteristics or factors, such as companies that are small, mid-sized, large, small value, large value, small growth, large growth, the level of gross profitability or investment capital, real estate, or indexes based on commodities and fixed-income. Companies are purchased and held within the index fund when they meet the specific index rules or parameters and are sold when they move outside of those rules or parameters. Think of an index fund as an investment utilizing rules-based investing. Some index providers announce changes of the companies in their index before the change date whilst other index providers do not make such announcements.  

The main advantage of index funds for investors is they don't require much time to manage as the investors don't have to spend time analyzing various stocks or stock portfolios. Most investors also find it difficult to beat the performance of the S&P 500 Index. Some legal scholars have previously suggested a value maximization and agency-costs theory for understanding index funds stewardship.

One index provider, Dow Jones Indexes, has 130,000 indices. Dow Jones Indexes says that all its products are maintained according to clear, unbiased, and systematic methodologies that are fully integrated within index families.

, index funds made up 20.2% of equity mutual fund assets in the US. Index domestic equity mutual funds and index-based exchange-traded funds (ETFs), have benefited from a trend towards more index-oriented investment products. From 2007 through 2014, index domestic equity mutual funds and ETFs received $1 trillion in new net cash, including reinvested dividends. Index-based domestic equity ETFs have grown particularly quickly, attracting almost twice the flows of index domestic equity mutual funds since 2007. In contrast, actively managed domestic equity mutual funds experienced a net outflow of $659 billion, including reinvested dividends, from 2007 to 2014.

Origins
The first theoretical model for an index fund was suggested in 1960 by Edward Renshaw and Paul Feldstein, both students at the University of Chicago. While their idea for an "Unmanaged Investment Company" garnered little support, it did start off a sequence of events in the 1960s.

Qualidex Fund, Inc., a Florida Corporation, chartered on 05/23/1967 (317247) by Richard A. Beach (BSBA Banking and Finance, University of Florida, 1957) and joined by Walton D. Dutcher Jr., filed a registration statement (2-38624) with the SEC on October 20, 1970 which became effective on July 31, 1972. "The fund organized as an open-end, diversified investment company whose investment objective is to approximate the performance of the Dow Jones Industrial Stock Average", thereby becoming the first index fund.

In 1973, Burton Malkiel wrote A Random Walk Down Wall Street, which presented academic findings for the lay public. It was becoming well known in the popular financial press that most mutual funds were not beating the market indices. Malkiel wrote:

John Bogle graduated from Princeton University in 1951, where his senior thesis was titled: "The Economic Role of the Investment Company". Bogle wrote that his inspiration for starting an index fund came from three sources, all of which confirmed his 1951 research: Paul Samuelson's 1974 paper, "Challenge to Judgment"; Charles Ellis' 1975 study, "The Loser's Game"; and Al Ehrbar's 1975 Fortune magazine article on indexing. Bogle founded The Vanguard Group in 1974; as of 2009 it was the largest mutual fund company in the United States.

Bogle started the First Index Investment Trust on December 31, 1975. At the time, it was heavily derided by competitors as being "un-American" and the fund itself was seen as "Bogle's folly". In the first five years of Bogle's company, it made 17 million dollars. Fidelity Investments Chairman Edward Johnson was quoted as saying that he "[couldn't] believe that the great mass of investors are going to be satisfied with receiving just average returns". Bogle's fund was later renamed the Vanguard 500 Index Fund, which tracks the Standard and Poor's 500 Index. It started with comparatively meager assets of $11 million but crossed the $100 billion milestone in November 1999; this astonishing increase was funded by the market's increasing willingness to invest in such a product. Bogle predicted in January 1992 that it would very likely surpass the Magellan Fund before 2001, which it did in 2000.

John McQuown and David G. Booth of Wells Fargo, and Rex Sinquefield of the American National Bank in Chicago, established the first two Standard and Poor's Composite Index Funds in 1973. Both of these funds were established for institutional clients; individual investors were excluded. Wells Fargo started with $5 million from their own pension fund, while Illinois Bell put in $5 million of their pension funds at American National Bank. In 1971, Jeremy Grantham and Dean LeBaron at Batterymarch Financial Management "described the idea at a Harvard Business School seminar in 1971, but found no takers until 1973. Two years later, in December 1974, the firm finally attracted its first index client."

In 1981, Booth and Sinquefield started Dimensional Fund Advisors (DFA), and McQuown joined its board of directors. DFA further developed indexed-based investment strategies. Vanguard started its first bond index fund in 1986.

Frederick L. A. Grauer at Wells Fargo harnessed McQuown and Booth's indexing theories, which led to Wells Fargo's pension funds managing over $69 billion in 1989 and over $565 billion in 1998. In 1996, Wells Fargo sold its indexing operation to Barclays Bank of London, which it operated under the name Barclays Global Investors (BGI). Blackrock, Inc. acquired BGI in 2009; the acquisition included BGI's index fund management (both its institutional funds and its iShares ETF business) and its active management.

Economic theory
Economist Eugene Fama said, "I take the market efficiency hypothesis to be the simple statement that security prices fully reflect all available information." 
A precondition for this "strong version" of the hypothesis is that information and trading costs, the costs of getting prices to reflect information, are always 0. 
A weaker and economically more sensible version of the efficiency hypothesis says that prices reflect information to the point where the marginal benefits of acting on information (the profits to be made) do not exceed marginal costs. 

Economists cite the efficient-market hypothesis (EMH) as the fundamental premise that justifies the creation of the index funds. The hypothesis implies that fund managers and stock analysts are constantly looking for securities that may out-perform the market; and that this competition is so effective that any new information about the fortune of a company will rapidly be incorporated into stock prices. It is postulated therefore that it is very difficult to tell ahead of time which stocks will out-perform the market. By creating an index fund that mirrors the whole market the inefficiencies of stock selection are avoided.

In particular, the EMH says that economic profits cannot be wrung from stock picking. This is not to say that a stock picker cannot achieve a superior return, just that the excess return will on average not exceed the costs of winning it (including salaries, information costs, and trading costs). The conclusion is that most investors would be better off buying a cheap index fund. Note that return refers to the ex-ante expectation; ex-post realisation of payoffs may make some stock-pickers appear successful. In addition, there have been many criticisms of the EMH.

Tracking
Tracking can be achieved by trying to hold all of the securities in the index, in the same proportions as the index. Other methods include statistically sampling the market and holding "representative" securities. Many index funds rely on a computer model with little or no human input in the decision as to which securities are purchased or sold and are thus subject to a form of passive management.

Fees
The lack of active management generally gives the advantage of much lower fees compared to actively managed mutual funds and, in taxable accounts, lower taxes. In addition it is usually impossible to precisely mirror the index as the models for sampling and mirroring, by their nature, cannot be 100% accurate. The difference between the index performance and the fund performance is called the "tracking error", or, colloquially, "jitter."

Index funds are available from many investment managers. Some common indices include the S&P 500, the Nikkei 225, and the FTSE 100. Less common indexes come from academics like Eugene Fama and Kenneth French, who created "research indexes" in order to develop asset pricing models, such as their Three Factor Model. The Fama–French three-factor model is used by Dimensional Fund Advisors to design their index funds. Robert Arnott and Professor Jeremy Siegel have also created new competing fundamentally based indexes based on such criteria as dividends, earnings, book value, and sales.

Indexing methods

Traditional indexing
Indexing is traditionally known as the practice of owning a representative collection of securities, in the same ratios as the target index. Modification of security holdings happens only periodically, when companies enter or leave the target index.

Synthetic indexing
Synthetic indexing is a modern technique of using a combination of equity index futures contracts and investments in low-risk bonds to replicate the performance of a similar overall investment in the equities making up the index. Although maintaining the future position has a slightly higher cost structure than traditional passive sampling, synthetic indexing can result in more favourable tax treatment, particularly for international investors who are subject to U.S. dividend withholding taxes. The bond portion can hold higher yielding instruments, with a trade-off of corresponding higher risk, a technique referred to as enhanced indexing.

Enhanced indexing
Enhanced indexing is a catch-all term referring to improvements to index fund management that emphasize performance, possibly using active management. Enhanced index funds employ a variety of enhancement techniques, including customized indexes (instead of relying on commercial indexes), trading strategies, exclusion rules, and timing strategies. The cost advantage of indexing could be reduced or eliminated by employing active management. Enhanced indexing strategies help in offsetting the proportion of tracking error that would come from expenses and transaction costs. These enhancement strategies can be:
 Lower cost, issue selection, yield curve positioning.
 Sector and quality positioning and call exposure positioning.

Advantages

Low costs
Because the composition of a target index is a known quantity, relative to actively managed funds, it costs less to run an index fund. Typically expense ratios of an index fund range from 0.10% for U.S. Large Company Indexes to 0.70% for Emerging Market Indexes. The expense ratio of the average large cap actively managed mutual fund as of 2015 is 1.15%. If a mutual fund produces 10% return before expenses, taking account of the expense ratio difference would result in an after expense return of 9.9% for the large cap index fund versus 8.85% for the actively managed large cap fund.

Simplicity
The investment objectives of index funds are easy to understand. Once an investor knows the target index of an index fund, what securities the index fund will hold can be determined directly. Managing one's index fund holdings may be as easy as  every six months or every year.

Lower turnovers
Turnover refers to the selling and buying of securities by the fund manager. Selling securities in some jurisdictions may result in capital gains tax charges, which are sometimes passed on to fund investors. Even in the absence of taxes, turnover has both explicit and implicit costs, which directly reduce returns on a dollar-for-dollar basis. Because index funds are passive investments, the turnovers are lower than actively managed funds.

No style drift
Style drift occurs when actively managed mutual funds go outside of their described style (i.e., mid-cap value, large cap income, etc.) to increase returns. Such drift hurts portfolios that are built with diversification as a high priority. Drifting into other styles could reduce the overall portfolio's diversity and subsequently increase risk. With an index fund, this drift is not possible and accurate diversification of a portfolio is increased.

Disadvantages

Losses to arbitrageurs
Index funds must periodically "rebalance" or adjust their portfolios to match the new prices and market capitalization of the underlying securities in the stock or other indexes that they track. This allows algorithmic traders (80% of the trades of whom involve the top 20% most popular securities) to perform index arbitrage by anticipating and trading ahead of stock price movements caused by mutual fund rebalancing, making a profit on foreknowledge of the large institutional block orders. This results in profits transferred from investors to algorithmic traders, estimated to be at least 21 to 28 basis points annually for S&P 500 index funds, and at least 38 to 77 basis points per year for Russell 2000 funds. In effect, an index, and consequently, all funds tracking an index are announcing ahead of time the trades that they are planning to make, allowing value to be siphoned by arbitrageurs, in a legal practice known as "index front running". Algorithmic high-frequency traders all have advanced access to the index re-balancing information, and spend large sums on fast technology to compete against each other to be the first—often by a few microseconds—to make these arbitrages.  Losses to arbitrageurs appear as "tracking error", the difference between the performance of the index and the fund which is attempting to follow it.

John Montgomery of Bridgeway Capital Management says that the resulting "poor investor returns" from trading ahead of mutual funds is "the elephant in the room" that "shockingly, people are not talking about." Related "time zone arbitrage" against mutual funds and their underlying securities traded on overseas markets is likely "damaging to financial integration between the United States, Asia and Europe."

Common market impact
One problem occurs when a large amount of money tracks the same index. According to theory, a company should not be worth more when it is in an index. But due to supply and demand, a company being added can have a demand shock, and a company being deleted can have a supply shock, and this will change the price. This does not show up in tracking error since the index is also affected. A fund may experience less impact by tracking a less popular index.

Possible tracking error from index
Since index funds aim to match market returns, both under- and over-performance compared to the market is considered a "tracking error". For example, an inefficient index fund may generate a positive tracking error in a falling market by holding too much cash, which holds its value compared to the market.

According to The Vanguard Group, a well-run S&P 500 index fund should have a tracking error of 5 basis points or less, but a Morningstar survey found an average of 38 basis points across all index funds.

Diversification

Diversification refers to the number of different securities in a fund. A fund with more securities is said to be better diversified than a fund with smaller number of securities. Owning many securities reduces volatility by decreasing the impact of large price swings above or below the average return in a single security. A Wilshire 5000 index would be considered diversified, but a bio-tech ETF would not.

Since some indices, such as the S&P 500 and FTSE 100, are dominated by large company stocks, an index fund may have a high percentage of the fund concentrated in a few large companies. This position represents a reduction of diversity and can lead to increased volatility and investment risk for an investor who seeks a diversified fund.

Some advocate adopting a strategy of investing in every security in the world in proportion to its market capitalization, generally by investing in a collection of ETFs in proportion to their home country market capitalization. A global indexing strategy may have lower variance in returns than one based only on home market indexes, because there may be less correlation between the returns of companies operating in different markets than between companies operating in the same market.

Asset allocation and achieving balance

Asset allocation is the process of determining the mix of stocks, bonds and other classes of investable assets to match the investor's risk capacity, which includes attitude towards risk, net income, net worth, knowledge about investing concepts, and time horizon. Index funds capture asset classes in a low-cost and tax-efficient manner and are used to design balanced portfolios.

A combination of various index mutual funds or ETFs could be used to implement a full range of investment policies from low to high risk.

Pension investment in index funds

Research conducted by the World Pensions Council (WPC) suggests that up to 15% of overall assets held by large pension funds and national social security funds are invested in various forms of passive strategies including index funds, as opposed to the more traditional actively managed that still constitute the largest share of institutional investments The proportion invested in passive funds varies widely across jurisdictions and fund type.

The relative appeal of index funds, ETFs and other index-replicating investment vehicles has grown rapidly for various reasons ranging from disappointment with underperforming actively managed mandates to the broader tendency towards cost reduction across public services and social benefits that followed the 2008-2012 Great Recession. Public-sector pensions and national reserve funds have been among the early adopters of index funds and other passive management strategies.

Comparison of index funds with index ETFs

In the United States, mutual funds price their assets by their current value every business day, usually at 4:00 p.m. Eastern time, when the New York Stock Exchange closes for the day. Index ETFs, in contrast, are priced during normal trading hours, usually 9:30 a.m. to 4:00 p.m. Eastern time. Index ETFs are also sometimes weighted by revenue rather than market capitalization.

Tax considerations

International tax considerations 
Typically mutual funds supply the correct tax reporting documents for only one country, which can cause tax problems for shareholders citizen to or resident of another country, either now or in the future.

Implications for US investors 
US citizens/taxpayers living at home or abroad should particularly consider whether their investment in an ex-US fund (meaning the fund is administered by a foreign investment company) not providing annual 1099 forms (which report distributed income and capital gains/losses) or annual PFIC annual information statements will be subject to punitive US taxation under section 1291 of the US tax code. Note that if a PFIC annual information statement is provided, a careful filing of form 8621 is required to avoid punitive US taxation.

U.S. capital gains tax considerations 
U.S. mutual funds are required by law to distribute realized capital gains to their shareholders. If a mutual fund sells a security for a gain, the capital gain is taxable for that year; similarly a realized capital loss can offset any other realized capital gains.

Scenario: An investor entered a mutual fund during the middle of the year and experienced an overall loss for the next six months. The mutual fund itself sold securities for a gain for the year, therefore must declare a capital gains distribution. The IRS would require the investor to pay tax on the capital gains distribution, regardless of the overall loss.

A small investor selling an ETF to another investor does not cause a redemption on ETF itself; therefore, ETFs are more immune to the effect of forced redemption causing realized capital gains.

See also
 Exchange-traded fund
 Passive management
 Stock market index
 Enhanced indexing

References

 John Bogle, Bogle on Mutual Funds: New Perspectives for the Intelligent Investor, Dell, 1994, 
 Mark T. Hebner, Foreword by Harry Markowitz, Index Funds: The 12-Step Recovery Program for Active Investors, IFA Publishing; Updated and Revised, 2015, 
 Taylor Larimore, Mel Lindauer, Michael LeBoeuf, The Bogleheads' Guide to Investing, Wiley, 2006, 
 From Berkshire Hathaway 2004 Annual Report; see Wikiquotes for text.

External links
Is Stock Picking Declining Around the World? The article argues that there is a move towards indexing.
The Lowdown on Index Funds Investopedia's introduction to Index Funds
False Discoveries in Mutual Fund Performance: Measuring Luck in Estimated Alphas Evidence that stock selection is not a viable investing strategy.
The Prescient Are Few - ..."the number of funds that have beaten the market over their entire histories is so small that the False Discovery Rate test can’t eliminate the possibility that the few that did were merely false positives" — just lucky, in other words.

Investment funds